Sphaerellothecium araneosum is a species of lichenicolous fungus in the family Phyllachoraceae.

Distribution
Sphaerellothecium araneosum has been reported from the highlands of Iceland and the Arctic desert of Severnaya Zemlya in Russia.

Host species and symptoms
Sphaerellothecium araneosum commonly grows on species of Ochrolechia, such as Ochrolechia frigida but it also grows on Stereocaulon rivulorum and Stereocaulon vesuvianum, on which it causes no known symptoms. It is common in Cladonia pocillum and Cladonia symphycarpia, and less common but present in Cladonia coccifera, Cladonia gracilis, Cladonia macroceras, Cladonia pyxidata and Cladonia subcervicornis. The population infecting Cladonia is considered a separate variety from other Sphaerellothecium araneosum.

References

Sordariomycetes
Fungi described in 1897
Fungi of Russia
Lichenicolous fungi
Taxa named by Ferdinand Christian Gustav Arnold